Kahili Airfield, also known as Buin Airfield, was an airfield located near Buin, Bougainville Island, Papua New Guinea.

History
The airfield was constructed by the Imperial Japanese Navy Air Service in November 1942. The airfield was later neutralized by Allied air bombing from 1943 and was abandoned after the cessation of hostilities.

Japanese Units based at Kahili Airfield included:
11th Air Fleet 
201st Kokutai (A6M Zero)
204th Kokutai (A6M Zero)
582nd Kokutai (D3A Val) 
Hiyo Detachment (A6M Zero)

See also
Buin Airport
Buka Airport
Kieta Airport

References

External links
https://web.archive.org/web/20120614000050/http://www.pacificwrecks.com/airfields/png/kahilli/index.html

Airports in Papua New Guinea
Autonomous Region of Bougainville